Jaworowa  is a village in the administrative district of Gmina Raszyn, within Pruszków County, Masovian Voivodeship, in east-central Poland.

The village has a population of 750.

References

Jaworowa